The 2005 UEFA European Under-19 Championship was held in Northern Ireland between 18  and 29 July 2005.

Venues

Qualifications
There were two separate rounds of qualifications held before the Final Tournament.

1. 2005 UEFA European Under-19 Championship qualification
2. 2005 UEFA European Under-19 Championship elite qualification

Teams
The eight teams that participated in the final tournament were:

 (host)

Match officials
Six referees were selected for the tournament:

 Alberto Undiano Mallenco
 Viktor Kassai
 Matteo Trefoloni
 Pieter Vink
 Duarte Gomes
 Damir Skomina

Squads

Group stage

Group A

Group B

Semi-finals

Final

Top scorers
5 goals
 Borko Veselinović

4 goals
 Abdoulaye Baldé
 Matty Fryatt

3 goals
 Yoann Gourcuff

2 goals
 Karim Aoudia
 Kevin-Prince Boateng
 Denis Epstein
 Nebojša Marinković
 Eugen Polanski

External links
Official website at UEFA.com
Match list at rsssf.com

 
UEFA European Under-19 Championship
UEFA
Uefa European Under-19 Championship, 2005
International association football competitions hosted by Northern Ireland
July 2005 sports events in the United Kingdom
2005 in youth association football